Thomas Bradley Hogarth known as Tom Hogarth (16 February 1878 – 12 July 1960) was a rugby union forward who played for Leicester Tigers, Hartlepool Rovers, West Hartlepool, Durham City and once for England.

Hogarth made his international debut for England on 22 March 1906 against France at Parc des Princes.  He then joined Leicester in March 1906, making his debut against Newport.  In 1908 his transfer to Leicester was subject of an RFU inquiry because of alleged professionalism.  Hogarth and the Leicester club were cleared of all charges, with Hogarth's testimony mentioned as beyond question, though the neutrality of the inquiry is questionable as the day it closed Leicester's Welford Road hosted an England international in which two of the other players involved in the inquiry started.

Hogarth became Leicester's first substitute in 1911 when he replaced Frank Tarr after only 2 minutes in a game against Manchester R.F.C.

Sources
Farmer,Stuart & Hands, David Tigers-Official History of Leicester Football Club (The Rugby DevelopmentFoundation )

References

1878 births
1960 deaths
English rugby union players
England international rugby union players
Leicester Tigers players
West Hartlepool R.F.C. players
Rugby union forwards
English blacksmiths
Rugby union players from Hartlepool
Durham County RFU players